The men's 3000 metres event  at the 1984 European Athletics Indoor Championships was held on 4 March.

Results

References

Results

3000 metres at the European Athletics Indoor Championships
3000